The 2003 MTV Europe Music Awards were held in Western Harbour in Edinburgh, Scotland. The awards ceremony was held in a 6,000-capacity big top arena constructed specifically for the main event.

On the night, Justin Timberlake notably received a total of three awards, for Best Male, Best Pop and Best Album.

Presenters included André 3000, Justin Timberlake, The Black Eyed Peas and Ludacris.

Nominations
Winners are in bold text.

Regional nominations
Winners are in bold text.

Performances

Pre show
Jane's Addiction — "True Nature"

Main show
Christina Aguilera — "Dirrty"
Beyoncé (featuring Sean Paul) — "Baby Boy"
Kylie Minogue — "Slow"
Missy Elliott — "Work It / Pass That Dutch"
The Black Eyed Peas (featuring Justin Timberlake) — "Where Is the Love?"
Travis — "The Beautiful Occupation"
The Chemical Brothers and The Flaming Lips — "Hey Boy Hey Girl (intro) / The Golden Path"
Dido — "White Flag"
Kraftwerk — "Aerodynamik"
The Darkness — "I Believe in a Thing Called Love"
The White Stripes — "Seven Nation Army"
Pink — "Trouble"

Appearances 
Pink — presented Best Album
Justin Timberlake — introduced Kylie Minogue
Shirley Manson and Sharleen Spiteri — presented Best Dance
Michael Stipe — introduced Dido
Andre 3000 — presented Best R&B
Dave Navarro and Perry Farrell — presented Best Rock
Kelly Osbourne — presented Best Pop
Billy Boyd and Gerard Butler — presented Best Hip-Hop
Kylie Minogue — introduced Kraftwerk
Christina Aguilera — presented the Free Your Mind Award
Sean Paul — presented Best Female
Pharrell Williams and Chad Hugo — presented Best Male
Minnie Driver — presented Best Video
Chris Pontius and Preston Lacy — presented Best Group
Chingy and Ludacris — presented Best New Act
Vin Diesel — presented Best Song

Live technical difficulties 
During the live performance of Beyoncé and Sean Paul's "Baby Boy" (near to Paul's rap), the back tracking of vocals ("Baby boy you are so damn fine") started to malfunction to repeat as well as losing the instrumental part of the song. Through the technical difficulties, Paul sang for a bit and Beyoncé asked the crowd how they were doing tonight in which received applause and cheers. The airing of the back tracking vocals were cut off from the live airing on TV, but was still being played through the venue. Both artist and the dancers exited off the stage in which also then resulted confusion among the presenters in which Christina Aguilera walked on to the stage to continue the event, the track stopped playing. After Pink presented the award for Best Album, the duo was asked if they would like to do a re-take in which both agreed and performed with the correct run of what was supposed to happen. The re-take would replace the original take on re-airings of the show, however it did not replace anything after the second take, the back tracking mistake was cut out completely, however, when Christina walked out. This also resulted the EMAs to be extended due to the second retake, which has never happened before.

See also
2003 MTV Video Music Awards

References

External links
Nominees

2003 in Scotland
2003 music awards
2003
2003 in British music
2000s in Edinburgh
November 2003 events in the United Kingdom